The blood–air barrier or air–blood barrier, (alveolar–capillary barrier or membrane) exists in the gas exchanging region of the lungs. It exists to prevent air bubbles from forming in the blood, and from blood entering the alveoli. It is formed by the type I pneumocytes of the alveolar wall, the endothelial cells of the capillaries and the basement membrane between the two cells. The barrier is permeable to molecular oxygen, carbon dioxide, carbon monoxide and many other gases.

Structure

This blood–air barrier is extremely thin (approximately 600 nm-2μm; in some places merely 200 nm) to allow sufficient oxygen diffusion, yet it is extremely strong. This strength comes from the type IV collagen in between the endothelial and epithelial cells.

Clinical significance
Failure of the barrier may occur in a pulmonary barotrauma. This can be a result of several possible causes, including blast injury, swimming-induced pulmonary edema, and breathing gas entrapment or retention in the lung during depressurization, which can occur during ascent from underwater diving or loss of pressure from a pressurized vehicle, habitat or pressure suit.

Possible consequences of rupture of the blood–air barrier include arterial gas embolism and hemoptysis.

See also

References

External links 
  – "Mammal, lung vasculature (EM, High)"
 

Respiratory system
Underwater diving physiology